Hou Sen (Chinese: 侯森; Pinyin: Hóu Sēn; born 30 June 1989) is a Chinese professional footballer who currently plays as a goalkeeper for Chinese Super League club Beijing Guoan.

Club career
Hou started his football career in 2009 when he was promoted to Beijing Guoan's first team squad. He played as a back-up goalkeeper for Yang Zhi and Zhang Sipeng. He became the first choice goalkeeper of Beijing Guoan in the beginning of 2012 season as Yang Zhi injured in the 2012 Guangdong–Hong Kong Cup. On 6 March 2012, he made his senior debut in the first round of 2012 AFC Champions League group stage which Beijing Guoan lost to Ulsan Hyundai 2–1. Hou returned to the bench after Yang Zhi recovered from injury in July.

Under the Head coach Roger Schmidt, Hou would re-emerge and fight for the first choice goalkeeper position with Guo Quanbo. He would go on to be in the starting line-up against Shandong Luneng Taishan as he won his first piece of silverware, with the 2018 Chinese FA Cup. While Zou Dehai was brought in the following season as the clubs first choice goalkeeper, Hou would once again establish himself as an integral member of the team and on 29 October 2022, Hou made his 100th appearance for Guoan in a 4-1 win against Guangzhou F.C.

Career statistics
Statistics accurate as of match played 15 February 2023.

Honours

Club
Beijing Guoan
Chinese FA Cup: 2018.

References

External links
 

1989 births
Living people
Chinese footballers
Footballers from Beijing
Beijing Guoan F.C. players
Association football goalkeepers
Chinese Super League players